The 1981–82 Sheffield Shield season was the 80th season of the Sheffield Shield, the domestic first-class cricket competition of Australia. South Australia won the championship. This was the last time that the championship was decided by virtue of the team topping the league ladder. The following season would see the top two teams playing in a final to determine the champions.

Table

Statistics

Most Runs
Kepler Wessels 1015

Most Wickets
Ian Callen 31

References

Sheffield Shield
Sheffield Shield
Sheffield Shield seasons